Kim zəngin olmaq istəyir? Milyonların Şousu is the Azerbaijani version of Who Wants to Be a Millionaire?. It started broadcasting on 3 October 2021 and is presented by DJ Fateh. The first Azerbaijani language version started 9 August 2002 and was known as Milyonçu. Dövlətli olmaq istərdinmi? and presented by İlhamiyyə Rzayeva and Azər Şabanov.  Milyonçu. Dövlətli olmaq istərdinmi? was broadcast for five years before it went off air.

Lifelines 

 Ask the Audience (Zalın köməyi): If any contestant uses this lifeline, the host will repeat the question to the audience. The studio audience gets ten seconds to answer the question. Audience members use touchpads to give the answer they believe to be correct. After the audience has made their selections, their choices will be displayed to the contestant in percentages in bar-graph format and also shown on the monitor screens of the host and contestant, as well as the TV viewers.
 50:50 (50 50-yə): If the contestant uses this lifeline, the host will ask the computer to remove two of the wrong answers, leaving one right answer and one wrong answer. This gives the contestant a 50% chance of choosing the correct answer.
 Phone a Friend (Dosta zəng): If the contestant uses this lifeline, they are allowed to call one of three pre-arranged friends, who all must provide their phone numbers in advance. The host usually begins by talking to the contestant's friend and introducing them to the viewers. After the introduction, the host will hand the phone call over to the contestant, who then gets thirty seconds to ask and hope for a reply from their friend.

Money Tree

2002-2006 (denominated in old Manat)

2007 (denominated in new Manat) 
The Azerbaijani currency, the manat, was redenominated at a ratio of 1 new manat for 5,000 old manat. Hence, the new top prize of 20,000 new manat was equivalent to the old top prize of 100,000,000 old manat.

2021-present (denominated in new Manat)

Winners (denominated in old Manat)

50,000,000m winners 

 Qasımova Aynur Davud qızı (episode 70, 2003)

25,000,000m winners 

 Əzimov Fikrət İbrahim oğlu (episode 91, 2003)
 Sevda Seyidova (2004)
 Nəbi Quliyev (November 26, 2004)

12,500,000m winners 

 Əsgərov Kamil Səfi oğlu (episode 19, 2002)
 Hüseyn Ülvi Cəmil oğlu (episode 21, 2002)
 Abışov Elçin Zakir oğlu (episode 31, 2003)
 Aygün Abdullayeva İsa qızı (episode 67, 2003)
 Xəlilov Ehtiram Sadıq (?)
 Mustafayev Nizami Camal (?)
 Salmanov Salman Elxan (?)
 İsmayilov Vüqar Rahib (?)
 Ağadıyev Elçin Hacıağa (?)
 Ramil Qaracayev (August 25, 2006)

6,400,000m winners 

 Məmmədova Dilarə Həmidulla qızı (episode 13, 2002)
 Abdullayev Elşad Mais oqlu (episode 32, 2003)
 İsqəndərov Zahid Ağalar oqlu (episode 37, 2003)
 Quliyeva Bilqeyis Baxhəli qızı (episode 49, 2003)
 Haqverdiyeva Sitarə Ümüd qızı (episode 52, 2003)
 Koroğluyev Mehman Əhəd oqlu (episode 54, 2003)
 Məmmədov Mübariz Cəmşid oqlu (episode 59, 2003)
 Abdullayev İlham İmran oğlu (episode 79, 2003)
 Nəzərova Xanımana Fərman qızı (episode 83, 2003)
 Pənahov Yunus Firuz oğlu (episode 86, 2003)
 Mahmudov Zaur Sabir oğlu (episode 87, 2003)
 Əhmədov Ramal Nürəddin oğlu (episode 92, 2003)
 Hikmet Verdiyev (November 2007)

3,200,000m winners 

 Hüseynov Vahid Şirvan oqlu (episode 8, 2002)
 Eminov Emin Rafiq oqlu (episode 10, 2002)
 Sadıqov Ramil Hüseünəli oqlu (episode 22, 2002–2003)
 Cəfərli Mübariz Tofiq oqlu (episode 24, 2002–2003)
 İbrahimova İradə Rza qızı (episode 26, 2002–2003)
 Abbaslı Namiq Rasim oqlu (episode 29, 2003)
 Allahverdiyev Bayram Hacıbağır oqlu (episode 33, 2003)
 Eminova Vəfa Baxış qızı (episode 33, 2003)
 Məhərrəmov İmran Məhərrəm oqlu (episode 41, 2003)
 Mustafayev Taleh Mais oqlu (episode 51, 2003)
 Həsənov Anar Qələndər oqlu (episode 53, 2003)
 Əhmədov Elton Hilal oqlu (episode 55, 2003)
 Quliyev Rövşən Kamal oqlu (episode 58, 2003)
 Baxşəliyev Zaur Lətif oqlu (episode 62, 2003)
 Rüzqar Hüseynov Mirzə oqlu (episode 65, 2003)
 Əfəndiyeva Şəfa Veysəl qızı (episode 68, 2003)
 Haciverdiyev Aydın Vaqif (episode 69, 2003)
 Ağamirov Vasif (episode 40, 2003)
 Babayeva Kamilə (episode 40, 2003)
 Tağıyev Oqtay Neftun (episode 71, 2003)
 Hacıağa Hacıyev Habil (episode 73, 2003)
 Kərəm Məmmədov Hətəm oğlu (episode 75, 2003)
 Ağamir Babayev Mir Əyyub oğlu (episode 76, 2003)
 Taleh Məmmədov İmanəli oğlu (episode 78, 2003)
 Fərman Fərmanov Əliyulla oğlu (episode 82, 2003)
 Kamran Əliyev Əliqulu oğlu (episode 84, 2003)
 Məmmədov Qəhrəman Məşdi oğlu (episode 85, 2003)
 Şəkərov Ramil Fikrət oğlu (episode 88, 2003)
 Abzərov Fərid İskəndər oğlu (episode 89, 2003)
 Süleymanov Elçin Hətəm oğlu (episode 90, 2003)
 Şəkərov Qəhraman Fikrət (episode 88, 2003)
 Abzərov Fərid İskəndər (episode 89, 2003)
 Süleymanov Glçin Hətəm (episode 90, 2003)
 Dadaşov Murad (January 30, 2004)
 İsmaylov Ceyhun (January 30, 2004)
 Yaqubov Ayaz Nəsir (episode 96, 2004)
 Ağayev Eldar Əhəd (episode 98, 2004)
 Qədirov Arzu Arif (episode 100, 2004)
 Əhmədova Vəfa Eldar (episode 107, 2004)
 Aliyev Ruslan Nizami (episode 110, 2004)
 Məmədov Pərviz Sani (episode 115, 2004)
 Osmanova Aytəkin Adil (episode 118, 2004)
 Əsqərli Elnur Knyaz (episode 119, 2004)
 Namazov Fuad Kamal (episode 119, 2004)

800,000m winners 

 Taleh Məmmədov İmanəli oğlu (episode 58, 2003)

200,000m winners 

 Rafiq Xamiyev (200?)

100,000m winners 

 Ədalət Shükurov (January 30, 2004)
 Toğrul Abbasov (August 25, 2006)

0m winners 

 Nizam Qəmbərli (2002)
 ? (200?)

?m winners 

 Vaqif Cəfərov - at least 100,000m (2002)
 Kamran Məmmədov - at least 0m (episode 31, 2003)
 Kəmalə Qasımova - at least 0m (episode 31, 2003)
 Nailə Rəsulova - at least 0m (episode 88, 2003)
 Paşa Quliyev - at least 100,000m (2004)
 Anar Vəliyev - at least 0m (November 2007)

References 

Who Wants to Be a Millionaire?
Azerbaijani television series
Lider TV original programming